Igor Nikulin may refer to:

Igor Nikulin (hammer thrower) (born 1960), Russian hammer thrower
Igor Nikulin (ice hockey) (born 1972), Russian ice hockey player